The city of Orlando, Florida, was incorporated in 1875. The first mayor, William Jackson Brack, took office in 1875. The Orlando mayor is officially a nonpartisan election.

The current mayor is Buddy Dyer, who was first elected in a special election in February 2003. Dyer was elected to his first full term in 2004, and after a brief suspension for six weeks in 2005, has subsequently been re-elected in 2008, 2012, 2015, and 2019.

List of mayors

Notes

 City commissioner G. H. Sutherland served as acting mayor after Eugene Goodman Duckworth resigned in the wake of a failed city commissioners recall election. Sutherland served for about four weeks until a special election was held. Former mayor James LeRoy Giles won the special election and served out the remainder of the term.
 Ernest Page was appointed interim mayor for about six weeks in March–April 2005 while Buddy Dyer was under investigation for election fraud stemming from the 2004 election. The charges against Dyer were dismissed, and Dyer was reinstated as mayor on April 20, 2005.

See also
 Timeline of Orlando, Florida

Notes

Works cited
World Statesman - Mayors of U.S. Cities M-W (Orlando)
Our Campaigns - Orlando mayor history
City of Orlando Election Results

References

External links
 Orlando Remembered: City Hall – Describes the city's exhibit of memorabilia from past mayors.

Orlando

Mayors